Events in the year 1907 in Japan.

Incumbents
Emperor: Emperor Meiji
Prime Minister: Saionji Kinmochi

Governors
Aichi Prefecture: Ichizo Fukano
Akita Prefecture: Chuji Shimooka
Aomori Prefecture: Shotaro Nishizawa
Ehime Prefecture: Kensuke Ando
Fukui Prefecture: Suke Sakamoto, Nakamura Junkuro
Fukushima Prefecture: Arita Yoshisuke then Hiraoka Teitaro
Gifu Prefecture: Sadakichi Usu
Gunma Prefecture: Yoshimi Teru, Arita Yoshisuke
Hiroshima Prefecture: Yamada Shunzō, Tadashi Munakata 
Ibaraki Prefecture: Otsuka, Mori Masataka
Iwate Prefecture: Sokkichi Oshikawa, Shinichi Kasai
Kagawa Prefecture: Motohiro Onoda 
Kumamoto Prefecture: Egi Kazuyuki, Norikichi Oshikawa
Kōchi Prefecture: Munakata Tadashi, Sada Suzuki
Kyoto Prefecture: Shoichi Omori
Mie Prefecture: Baron Shoichi Omori
Miyagi Prefecture: Kamei Ezaburo
Miyazaki Prefecture: Nagai Enjin
Nagano Prefecture: Tsunamasa Ōyama 
Niigata Prefecture: Hiroshi Abe, Kiyoshi Honba
Okayama Prefecture: Terada Yushi
Okinawa Prefecture: Narahara Shigeru
Osaka Prefecture: Chikaaki Takasaki
Saga Prefecture: Fai Kagawa
Saitama Prefecture: Marquis Okubo, Toshi Takeshi, Shimada Gotaro
Shiga Prefecture: Sada Suzuki
Shimane Prefecture: Matsunaga Takeyoshi
Tochigi Prefecture: .....
Tokyo: Baron Senge Takatomi
Toyama Prefecture: Usami Katsuo
Yamagata Prefecture: Mabuchi Eitaro

Events
February 5 – Nisshin Spinning, later Nisshinbo founded.
February 15 – Gentlemen's Agreement of 1907
May Unknown date
Maruzen Petroleum, as predecessor of Cosmo Petroleum was founded in Osaka.
Seasoning, food processing, medication brand, Ajinomoto was founded by Saburosuke Suzuki in Kyobashi, Tokyo, as predecessor name was Suzuki Pharmaceutical Manufacturing. 
May 11 – Hinode Life Insurance, later Sumitomo Life Insurance was founded. 
June 10 – Franco-Japanese Treaty of 1907
July 24 – Japan–Korea Treaty of 1907
September 7 – Asahi Grass (now AGC) founded in Amagasaki, Hyogo Prefecture.

Births
January 1 – Kinue Hitomi, sprinter and long jumper (d. 1931)
January 8 – Keizō Hayashi, civil servant (d. 1991)
January 23 – Hideki Yukawa, theoretical physicist, Nobel laureate (d. 1981)
February 25 – Utaemon Ichikawa, actor (d. 1999)
March 17 – Takeo Miki , 41st Prime Minister of Japan (d. 1988)
April 29 – Chūya Nakahara, poet (d. 1937)
May 6 – Yasushi Inoue, author (d. 1991)
August 1 – Hisato Ohzawa, composer (d. 1953)
August 12 – Noriko Awaya, soprano chanson and ryūkōka singer (d. 1999)
October 1 – Ryōichi Hattori, composer (d. 1993)

Deaths
March 12 – Matsumoto Jun, physician (b. 1832)
September 2 – Kuga Katsunan, journalist (b. 1857)
October 5 – Nakayama Yoshiko, lady-in-waiting, mother of Emperor Meiji (b. 1836)
December 16 – Asai Chū, painter (b. 1856)

References

 
1900s in Japan